The International Americas Cup Class is a class of racing yacht that was developed for the America's Cup between 1992 and 2007.  These yachts, while not identical, were all designed to the same formula to offer designers the freedom to experiment whilst keeping the boats sufficiently comparable to race in real time.  The class was established for the 1992 America's Cup because of perceived shortcomings of the 12-metre class, which had been used in the America's Cup since 1958.

In addition to the America's Cup, IACC yachts were raced in other regattas, including the IACC worlds.

IACC Sail numbers
IACC sail numbers were issued according to the date when the ACM measurement committee decided that the hull has reached a certain stage of completion. The number came in two parts: the flag state (represented by a three letter prefix) and the hull number. The country code changed as the hull was transferred from flag state to flag state. Only one boat had a sail number issued twice as in the case of RUS-62 which was a new boat based on the heavily modified hull of RUS-24 and re-registered as RUS-62.

IACC Rule
Version 5.0 of the International America's Cup Class Rule was issued on December 15, 2003. Copyright is held jointly by the Defender Alinghi and the 'Challenger of Record' BMW Oracle Racing.

Typical parameters of an IACC yacht were:

length: 
weight: 
height of the mast: 
weight of the bulb: 
sail surface area:  upwind,  downwind
crew: 17+ "18th man"

Winning IACC yachts and teams

America's Cup

2007 America's Cup Winner - Alinghi SUI-100 (defender), Switzerland
2003 America's Cup Winner - Alinghi SUI-64 (challenger), Switzerland
2000 America's Cup Winner - Team New Zealand NZL-60 (defender), Team New Zealand, New Zealand
1995 America's Cup Winner - Team New Zealand NZL-32 (challenger), New Zealand
1992 America's Cup Winner - America³ USA-23 (defender), United States

Louis Vuitton Cup

2007 Louis Vuitton Cup Winner - Emirates Team New Zealand NZL-92, New Zealand
 2003 Louis Vuitton Cup Winner - Alinghi SUI-64, Switzerland
2000 Louis Vuitton Cup Winner - Prada Challenge ITA-45, Italy
1995 Louis Vuitton Cup Winner- Team New Zealand NZL-32, New Zealand
1992 Louis Vuitton Cup Winner - Il Moro di Venezia ITA-16, Italy

Umpire Signaling System (“USS”)
The 2007 America’s Cup saw the introduction of the ‘’Umpire Signaling System’’ (USS) which allowed the Umpires to notify the two boats regarding their position in relation to each other when overtaking and their position relating to a mark of the course when in close proximity of the mark.

On both the defender and the challenger there was a display unit with three LED lights coloured green, amber and white respectively.

GREEN lamp: ZONE ENTRY. Status ‘On’ indicates that the leading yacht has entered a zone of two or three boat lengths from the mark.
AMBER lamp: OVERLAP. Status ‘On’ indicates that the bow of the overtaking yacht is overlapping the stern of the leading yacht and there is no restriction on the leeward yacht to steer a direct course for the next mark.  The leeward yacht may point higher than the direct course to the next mark causing the windward yacht to either tack or sail higher than needed to the next mark.
WHITE lamp: RULE 17.1. Status ‘On’ indicates that the depth of the overlap has increased to the point where the yacht to leeward must now steer a proper course to the mark and hence cannot point higher and force the overtaking yacht to either tack or sail a higher course to the next mark.

The rules of racing define what tactics/maneuvers are permissible when a yacht nears a mark and also when a trailing yacht starts to overtake the boat in front.  The purpose of the USS is to remove doubt and associated protests caused by competitors having differing opinions of either their positions relative to each other or their distance from marks and then performing tactical maneuvers prohibited by the racing rules.

The system was developed by Pilotfish Networks AB.

The Formula
Formula:

DSP: displacement in cubic metres;
L: rated length in metres;
S: rated sail area in square metres;

18th man
The International America's Cup Class yachts were crewed by 17 individuals.  The boats had to carry what was known as the "18th man", a passenger or the equivalent weight up to 100 kg.  This was a highly sought-after position, often filled by a celebrity or a representative from one of the key sponsors to the team.

The end of the IACC
Immediately after the conclusion of the 2007 America's Cup, Brad Butterworth officially announced on behalf of Alinghi and America's Cup Management that a new design of boat would be sailed in the next edition of the America's Cup. The feeling was that the existing IACC rule had evolved as far as was practical and that in the spirit of the America's Cup, a new design challenge was needed.

Alinghi eventually promulgated a new design, called the AC 90. Plans to introduce this class were superseded by Alinghi's loss to BMW Oracle in the 2010 America's Cup and the subsequent creation of the AC72 class of catamarans.

The last IACC yacht completed was hull number 100, the 2007 defender; the last regatta to see IACC boats racing was the Louis Vuitton Trophy in Dubai November 2010.

See also
 Maxi yacht
 List of International America's Cup Class Yachts
 Louis Vuitton Cup

References